Rhembastus remaudierei is a species of leaf beetle of Mali. It was described by the French entomologist Pierre Hippolyte Auguste Jolivet in 1953.

References

Eumolpinae
Beetles of Africa
Beetles described in 1953
Insects of West Africa